Robert Lewandowski is the all-time top goalscorer for the Poland national football team. As of 4 December 2022, he has scored 78 goals in 138 appearances since his debut on 10 September 2008.

On 5 October 2017, Lewandowski scored a hat-trick in a 6–1 win over Armenia to take his tally to 50 goals for Poland, surpassing the previous record of 48 goals set by Włodzimierz Lubański to become the all-time top scorer for Poland.

International goals

Hat-tricks

Statistics

See also
 List of men's footballers with 50 or more international goals
 List of top international men's football goal scorers by country

Notes

References

Lewandowski, Robert
Poland national football team records and statistics
Lewandowski, Robert